Ault Park is the fourth-largest park in Cincinnati at 223.949 acres (0.9 km²), owned and operated by the Cincinnati Park Board. It lies in the Mount Lookout neighborhood on the city's east side. The hilltop park has an overlook which commands extensive panoramic views of the Little Miami River valley.

The park is named in honor of Ida May Ault and her husband Levi Addison Ault, who was prominent in the development of Cincinnati parks. In the park's early years, 97 sheep were employed to trim the lawns and shrubs.

The park sports a soccer field, playground, and an impressive flower garden, first designed by George Kessler and later modified by A. D. Taylor. At the center of the park is a large Pavilion, built in 1930 in the Italian Renaissance-style. The Pavilion is used frequently for dances, parties, and weddings.

Public Garden

In 1980 the Cincinnati Park Board asked its volunteer organization based out of Krohn Conservatory to implement an adopt-a-plot program for the Ault Park gardens, encouraging citizens to adopt a plot of the garden. The program was a huge success and in 1983 the park won the illustrious Daniel Flaherty Park Excellence Award competition. The adopt-a-plot program is still in use today and has become popular in parks over the whole country.

Events
Ault Park plays host to a large 4th of July celebration and fireworks display, as well as the Ault Park Concours d'Elegance (an invitational Antique and Exotic car display that is the second oldest of its type in the United States). During the summer months the park also hosts a summer concert series and an Annual Dance Night. On October 9, 2008 Democratic Presidential Candidate Barack Obama spoke to a crowd of approximately 15,000 people from atop the historic Ault Park Pavilion. Also speaking that day was Ohio Governor Ted Strickland.

References

Parks in Cincinnati